Colleton County School District is a school district headquartered in Walterboro, South Carolina. It serves all of Colleton County.

Schools
Secondary (all residents are assigned to these two schools)
 Colleton County High School
 Colleton County Middle School

Elementary schools:
 Bells Elementary School
 Cottageville Elementary School
 Forest Hills Elementary School
 Hendersonville Elementary School
 Northside Elementary School

Early childhood:
 Black Street Early Childhood Center

Other:
 Colleton County Adult Education
 Colleton County Alternative School
 Thunderbolt Career & Technology Center

References

External links
 
School districts in South Carolina
Education in Colleton County, South Carolina